The Eagle Station meteorite is a pallasite and type specimen of the Eagle Station group.

It was found in 1880 close to Eagle Station, Carroll County, Kentucky (United States). The first description was made by George F. Kunz in 1887.

References

See also
 Glossary of meteoritics
 

Achondrite meteorites
Meteorites found in the United States
1880 in Kentucky
Geology of Kentucky